The 1963 Grand National was the 117th renewal of the Grand National horse race that took place at Aintree Racecourse near Liverpool, England, on 30 March 1963.

The race was won narrowly by 66/1 shot Ayala, ridden by 19-year-old jockey Pat Buckley. Forty-seven horses ran and all returned safely to the stables. Ayala was jointly owned by his trainer, Keith Piggott, father of Lester Piggott, and by Raymond Bessone, the hairdresser also known as Teasy-Weasy. Piggott's father (and Lester's grandfather), Ernie, rode
the winners of the National in 1912 and 1919.

Finishing order

Non-finishers

Media coverage

David Coleman presented Grand National Grandstand on the BBC. The commentary team remained the same as the previous year, Peter O'Sullevan, Bob Haynes and Peter Montague-Evans.

References

 1963
Grand National
Grand National
20th century in Lancashire
March 1963 sports events in the United Kingdom